Funerary archaeology (or burial archaeology) is a branch of archaeology that studies the treatment and commemoration of the dead. It includes the study of human remains, their burial contexts, and from single grave goods through to monumental landscapes. Funerary archaeology might be considered a sub-set of the study of religion and belief. A wide range of expert areas contribute to funerary archaeology, including epigraphy, material culture studies, thanatology, human osteology, zooarchaeology and stable isotope analysis.

Bibliography
 Parker Pearson, M. (1999) The Archaeology of Death and Burial. Stroud: Sutton.
 Tarlow, S. and Nilsson Stutz, L. eds. (2013). The Oxford Handbook of Death and Burial. Oxford: Oxford University Press.

References

Archaeological sub-disciplines